"Joys" is a song produced and recorded by Italian electronic/house DJ/remixer Roberto Surace, which samples The S.O.S. Band's 1986 single "The Finest". The song became Surace's first number one on both Billboards Dance Club Songs chart and joint ventured Shazam Ibiza dance charts (in its 12 October and 30 September 2019 issues, respectively), and in Australia on the ARIA Club Chart (in its 30 September 2019 issue).

Track listing
Extended mix
"Joys" (Extended Mix) – 6:40

Todd Terry mix
"Joys" (Todd Terry Mix) – 2:15

Purple Disco Machine mix
"Joys" (Purple Disco Mix) – 2:58

Charts

Weekly charts

Year-end charts

References

External links
Official lyric video from YouTube

2019 singles
2019 songs
Electronic songs
House music songs
Songs written by Jimmy Jam and Terry Lewis